E! is an American television network.

E! may also refer to:

Television 
 E! (Asian TV channel), the Asian franchise of E!
 E! (Australia and New Zealand), the Australian version of E!
 E! (Canadian TV channel), a Canadian cable/satellite television channel owned by Bell Media
 E! (Canadian TV system), a defunct (2001–2009) over-the-air television system operated by Canwest
 E! (European TV channel), the European version of E!
 E! (French TV channel), the French version of E!
 SBS funE, a South Korean cable/satellite television channel previously known as SBS E!

Other 
 "E!" the existence predicate as used in free logic
 Eureka (organisation) is an intergovernmental organisation for research and development funding and coordination

See also
 E (disambiguation)